Cairnlea is a suburb in Melbourne, Victoria, Australia,  north-west of Melbourne's Central Business District, located within the City of Brimbank local government area. Cairnlea recorded a population of 10,038 at the 2021 census.

The former Albion site became open grassland after European settlement but later, from 1939, it was a government explosives manufacturing site. The site closed in the 1990s.

The suburb is a new estate, and has only been developed since 1999, with development of the new suburb to finish in mid-2005. The suburb features several man-made lakes and has implemented a suburb-wide stormwater recycling system that feeds all the lakes.

By 2011 Cairnlea is projected to have 3,000 residential blocks and to have a population of more than 10,000. It covers  bounded by Station Road, the Western Highway and the Western Ring Road.

Some  have been set aside for public open space. Part of that process has seen two endangered species (the Plains Rice-flower and the Striped Legless Lizard) having reserves and management plans set up for their preservation.

Facilities

Education
 Cairnlea Park Primary School

Economy
The Cairnlea Shopping Centre provides a number of small shops, a super-clinic, a Coles supermarket (6 AM - 10 PM) and a number of food and dining outlets. It is located at the intersection of Cairnlea Drive and Furlong Road at the heart of the district.

Attractions
 The Black Powder Mill
 Cairnlea Community Hub
 Cairnlea Town Centre
 The Victorian Croquet Club
 Cairnlea FC
 Iramoo

Flora and fauna

Kororoit Creek is located on the southern border of the suburb and Jones Creek on the Northern Border. The creeks have been home to healthy populations of native reptiles for thousands of years, including Tiger snake, Eastern Blue-tongued Lizard and Eastern brown snake. Unfortunately, due to development over the past 20 years, these species are now rarely seen in the area.

Due to development of lakes and wetlands, species of frogs have reclaimed the area. The Eastern Banjo Frog, Common Eastern Froglet and even the now endangered Growling Grass Frog have been seen and heard in the new wetlands and in Kororoit Creek. Some species of birds are also returning to the creeks and lakes, such as pelicans and cormorants.

 Brimbank Park
 Kororoit Creek Trail

References

Suburbs of Melbourne
Suburbs of the City of Brimbank